Cemetery Girls may refer to:

Films 
Cemetery Girls, an alternative title for Count Dracula's Great Love (originally El gran amor del conde Drácula), a 1974 Spanish film directed by Javier Aguirre
Cemetery Girls, an alternative title for The Velvet Vampire, an American vampire movie from 1971 directed by Stephanie Rothman
Cemetery Girls, an alternative title for Vampire Hookers, a 1978 film directed by Cirio H. Santiago

Music 
"Cemetery Girls", a song on Voobaha, the 1980 debut album by novelty rock group Barnes & Barnes
"Cemetery Girls", a song on Abominations (album), the 2007 studio album by Schoolyard Heroes
"Cemetery Girls", a song on Mutilation Mix, the 1997 greatest hits album by American hip hop group Insane Clown Posse